The Loch of Stenness is a large brackish loch on Mainland, Orkney, Scotland and is named for the parish of Stenness. In Old Norse its name was Steinnesvatn.

Hydrography
The Loch of Stenness is a sea loch and is the deepest loch on the Mainland, it is slightly smaller in area and volume than the Loch of Harray. Its outflow is into the Bay of Ireland and the Hoy Sound at Brig o’ Waithe where tidal currents influence the loch but cause little variation in its level. The loch is connected to the Loch of Harray at the Bridge of Brodgar and both lochs together cover an area of  making the two combined the ninth largest loch in Scotland by area (as listed by Murray and Pullar (1910)).

Natural history
The Loch of Stenness is important in terms of its biodiversity because of its brackish composition.  It has been designated a Site of Special Scientific Interest as well as a Special Area of Conservation. Its varying salt content supports a range of wildlife suited to marine, brackish and fresh water conditions including burrowing worms, bivalves such as mussels and mya arenaria, the snail Hydrobia ulvae and various types of green algae known as charophytes. It provides a wintering ground for a wide variety of wildfowl including pochard, tufted duck, scaup and goldeneye.

Archaeology

The Loch of Stenness is adjacent to the World Heritage sites of Ring of Brodgar and the Stones of Stenness.

The loch and its surrounding area underwent detailed geophysical and multibeam sonar surveys in 2011 and 2012 to investigate the drowned palaeo-landscape. The surveys indicated significant archaeological features in the loch including a circular structure possibly a henge.

References 

 Murray, Sir John and Pullar, Laurence (1910) Bathymetrical Survey of the Fresh-Water Lochs of Scotland, 1897-1909. London; Challenger Office.
 This article incorporates text from - Wilson, Rev. John The Gazetteer of Scotland (Edinburgh, 1882) Published by W. & A.K. Johnstone

Stenness
Sites of Special Scientific Interest in Orkney
Special Areas of Conservation in Scotland
World Heritage Sites in Scotland
Stenness
Mainland, Orkney